Help Conquer Cancer is a volunteer computing project that runs on the BOINC platform. It is a joint project of the Ontario Cancer Institute and the Hauptman-Woodward Medical Research Institute. It is also the first project under World Community Grid to run with a GPU counterpart.

Project Purpose
The goal is to enhance the efficiency of protein X-ray crystallography, which will enable researchers to determine the structure of many cancer-related proteins faster.  This will lead to improving the understanding of the function of these proteins, and accelerate the development of new pharmaceutical drugs.

See also
 BOINC
 List of volunteer computing projects
 World Community Grid

External links
 Help Conquer Cancer

References

Berkeley Open Infrastructure for Network Computing projects
Science in society
Free science software
Cancer organizations based in Canada
Volunteer computing projects